The Oeffag C.II was a military reconnaissance aircraft produced in Austria-Hungary during World War I.

Specifications

References

C.II
1910s Austro-Hungarian military reconnaissance aircraft
Biplanes
Single-engined tractor aircraft
Aircraft first flown in 1916